Centerdale (also known as Centredale) is a village within the town of North Providence, Rhode Island.  The historic Allendale Mill (1822) is located in Centerdale.

References

Villages in Rhode Island
North Providence, Rhode Island
Villages in Providence County, Rhode Island